Wilhelm Kernen (6 August 1929 – 12 November 2009) was a Swiss footballer.

He played for FC La Chaux-de-Fonds from 1950 to 1962, winning two Swiss league titles and five Swiss Cups. He also earned 41 caps and scored 1 goal for the Switzerland national football team, and participated in three World Cups.

References

External links

1929 births
2009 deaths
Swiss men's footballers
Switzerland international footballers
1950 FIFA World Cup players
1954 FIFA World Cup players
1962 FIFA World Cup players
Swiss football managers
FC La Chaux-de-Fonds managers
Swiss Super League players
Association football defenders
People from La Chaux-de-Fonds
Sportspeople from the canton of Neuchâtel